Giorgio Di Centa (born 7 October 1972 in Tolmezzo, Province of Udine) is an Italian former cross-country skier who won two gold medals at the 2006 Winter Olympics, including the individual 50 km freestyle race. He is the younger brother of Olympic gold medalist, cross-country skier Manuela Di Centa.

Biography
Di Centa began cross-county skiing very early in a family in which his elder brother Andrea was also a professional skier. At the age of 16 he became a member of Italy's junior team while also skiing for the Carabinieri sport team. He became a member of Italy's senior team in 1995. He finished 8th in the 30 km event at the 1998 Winter Olympics.

After a silver medal at the 2005 FIS Nordic World Ski Championships in the double pursuit and a silver medal at the 2002 Winter Olympics in the 4 x 10 km. Di Centa, who had never won an individual race in the cross-country skiing World Cup, arrived in great shape for the 2006 Winter Olympics in Turin. He would finish a disappointing fourth in the 30 km double pursuit, losing a medal at the finish to fellow Italian Pietro Piller Cottrer. The two were also key players in the strongest Italian relay team ever, winning gold in the 4 x 10 km race.

Di Centa's greatest victory was in the 50 km race where he defeated Russian Eugeni Dementiev by 0.8 seconds, the closest 50 km event in Olympic history, eclipsing Thomas Wassberg's 4.9 second victory over Gunde Svan (both Sweden) at the 1984 Winter Olympics in Sarajevo. The medals ceremony for the 50 km occurred during the Closing Ceremony where Di Centa's sister, Olympic medalist Manuela Di Centa, presented him with the gold medal. He won a bronze medal in the 15 km + 15 km double pursuit at the FIS Nordic World Ski Championships 2009 in Liberec.

For the 2010 Winter Olympics, a picture of Di Centa in competition during the 50 km event at the previous Olympics was used as a pictogram for the cross-country skiing events. In September 2009, it was announced that Di Centa was named flagbearer for the opening ceremony for the 2010 Games.

He retired on 1 March 2015 at the age of 42, after the end of the 50 km at the FIS Nordic World Ski Championships 2015.

On 20 December 2015 he returned to the World Cup race in the 15 km classic in Toblach, Italy.

The father of three children, his daughter Martina competed for Italy at the 2022 Winter Olympics in Cross-country skiing.

Cross-country skiing results
All results are sourced from the International Ski Federation (FIS).

Olympic Games
 3 medals – (2 gold, 1 silver)

World Championships
 4 medals – (1 silver, 3 bronze)

World Cup

Season standings

Individual podiums
1 victory – (1 )
13 podiums – (10 , 3 )

Team podiums
 7 victories – (2 , 5 ) 
 23 podiums – (15 , 8 ) 

Note:  Until the 1999 World Championships, World Championship races were included in the World Cup scoring system.

See also
 List of flag bearers for Italy at the Olympics

References

External links
 

1972 births
Living people
People from Tolmezzo
Italian male cross-country skiers
Cross-country skiers at the 1998 Winter Olympics
Cross-country skiers at the 2002 Winter Olympics
Cross-country skiers at the 2006 Winter Olympics
Cross-country skiers at the 2010 Winter Olympics
Cross-country skiers at the 2014 Winter Olympics
Olympic gold medalists for Italy
Olympic silver medalists for Italy
Olympic cross-country skiers of Italy
Olympic medalists in cross-country skiing
Cross-country skiers of Centro Sportivo Carabinieri
FIS Nordic World Ski Championships medalists in cross-country skiing
Tour de Ski skiers
Medalists at the 2006 Winter Olympics
Medalists at the 2002 Winter Olympics
Sportspeople from Friuli-Venezia Giulia